Los Angeles City Council District 14 is one of the 15 districts of the Los Angeles City Council. The district, which has a large Latin American population, includes the neighborhoods of Boyle Heights, Downtown Los Angeles and parts of Northeast Los Angeles. Councilman Kevin de León has represented the district since 2020. He replaced José Huizar after winning outright in the special election held during the 2020 California primaries; he was officially appointed on October 15, 2020. Huizar had vacated the seat earlier in the year due to bribery and corruption allegations.

Geography

Modern
District 14 consists of all or part of the neighborhoods of the Downtown, Boyle Heights, Eagle Rock, Highland Park, El Sereno, Garvanza, Glassell Park, Lincoln Heights, and Monterey Hills.  The Boyle Heights and Northeast sections are connected by a narrow strip of land.

Historic
A new city charter effective in 1925 replaced the former "at large" voting system for a nine-member council with a district system with a 15-member council. Each district was to be approximately equal in population, based upon the voting in the previous gubernatorial election; thus redistricting was done every four years. (At present, redistricting is done every ten years, based upon the preceding U.S. census results.) The numbering system established in 1925 for City Council districts began with No. 1 in the north of the city, the San Fernando Valley, and ended with No. 15 in the south, the Harbor area.

District 14 has always represented Eagle Rock and Highland Park. As the city's population increased, it has expanded southward. The rough boundaries or descriptions of the district have been as follows:

 1925: The communities of Eagle Rock, Highland Park and Annandale.
 1928: Westward extension to Allesandro Street.
 1932–33:  East boundary: South Pasadena and Pasadena. North: Glendale. West: Glendale Boulevard.
 1935: Same general area as 1932, with the western boundary at Griffith Park, thus including the Atwater area.
 1940: Same general area as previously, with the west boundary at Glendale Boulevard.
 1955: Rose Hill [sic] is now included in the district's description.
 1971: "The district begins in the East Los Angeles Mexican-American barrios of El Sereno and Lincoln Heights extends westward across the Pasadena Freeway to Anglo middle-class homes in Glassell Park, Highland Park, Hermon, and Eagle Rock through Griffith Park. Around the western edge of the district is the Los Feliz District, with some of the city's more expensive homes."
 1986: No longer includes Los Feliz. Southern reach includes El Sereno, College Avenue, Huntington Drive and portions of Alhambra Avenue and Valley Boulevard, then across the San Bernardino Freeway to Brooklyn Avenue, East Beverly Boulevard, Fourth Street and Whittier Boulevard.

Officeholders
District 14 has been represented by 10 men and no women.

See also
Los Angeles City Council districts
Los Angeles City Council
 Torristas and Molinistas, a term used to describe a political feud in Los Angeles in the last part of the 20th century

References

External links
 Official Los Angeles City Council District 14 website
 City of Los Angeles: Map of District 14

Los Angeles City Council districts
Downtown Los Angeles
Eastside Los Angeles
Northeast Los Angeles
Boyle Heights, Los Angeles
Eagle Rock, Los Angeles
El Sereno, Los Angeles
Glassell Park, Los Angeles
Lincoln Heights, Los Angeles